Gansner Field  is a public use airport owned by and located in Plumas County, California, United States. The airport is one nautical mile (2 km) north of the center of Quincy, California. It is included in the National Plan of Integrated Airport Systems for 2011–2015, which categorized it as a general aviation facility.

Facilities and aircraft 
Gansner Field covers an area of 88 acres (36 ha) at an elevation of 3,419 feet (1,042 m) above mean sea level. It has one runway designated 6/24 with an asphalt surface measuring 4,105 by 60 feet (1,251 x 18 m).

For the 12-month period ending December 31, 2011, the airport had 9,000 aircraft operations, an average of 24 per day: 94% general aviation, 4% air taxi, and 1% military. At that time there were 29 aircraft based at this airport: 93% single-engine, 3 multi-engine, and 3% ultralight.

See also 
 List of airports in California

References

External links 
 Airports page at Plumas County website
 Aerial image as of August 1998 from USGS The National Map
 

Airports in Plumas County, California